Kim Joo-won (formerly Kim Jun-su; born July 29, 1991) is a South Korean footballer who plays for Jeju United FC in K League 1.

References

External links

1991 births
Living people
Pohang Steelers players
Jeonnam Dragons players
K League 1 players
South Korean footballers
Association football defenders
Yeungnam University alumni